The 2006–07 Houston Rockets season was the 40th season of the Houston Rockets franchise in the NBA. The team ended the regular season with a 52–30 record and a 3rd-place finish in the Southwest. The Rockets faced the Utah Jazz in the playoffs, losing the series in seven games. The Rockets had the third best team defensive rating in the NBA.

With the playoff loss, the Rockets made the decision to fire head coach Jeff Van Gundy on May 18, 2007. Five days later, former San Diego Rockets (now the Houston Rockets) player Rick Adelman was hired in Van Gundy's position.

Like the previous two seasons,  Tracy McGrady and Yao Ming once again were selected to play in the 2007 NBA All-Star Game in Las Vegas. However, McGrady was the only team representative as Yao did not play due to an injury. It was Yao's fifth All-Star appearance and the last of seven All-Star appearances for McGrady as later injuries began to slow him down and eventually limit his playing time.

Pre-season

NBA Draft

Roster

Roster notes
Jake Tsakalidis was born in the Republic of Georgia, but he represented Greece internationally.
Bob Sura missed the entire season with a knee injury.

Regular season

Standings

Record vs. opponents

Playoffs

|- align="center" bgcolor="#ccffcc"
| 1
| April 21
| Utah
| W 84–75
| Yao Ming (28)
| Yao Ming (13)
| Rafer Alston (8)
| Toyota Center18,195
| 1–0
|- align="center" bgcolor="#ccffcc"
| 2
| April 23
| Utah
| W 98–90
| Tracy McGrady (31)
| Chuck Hayes (12)
| Alston, McGrady (5)
| Toyota Center18,206
| 2–0
|- align="center" bgcolor="#ffcccc"
| 3
| April 26
| @ Utah
| L 67–81
| Yao Ming (26)
| Yao Ming (14)
| Rafer Alston (5)
| EnergySolutions Arena19,911
| 2–1
|- align="center" bgcolor="#ffcccc"
| 4
| April 28
| @ Utah
| L 85–98
| Yao Ming (20)
| Alston, Yao (9)
| Rafer Alston (6)
| EnergySolutions Arena19,911
| 2–2
|- align="center" bgcolor="#ccffcc"
| 5
| April 30
| Utah
| W 96–82
| Tracy McGrady (26)
| Yao Ming (15)
| Tracy McGrady (16)
| Toyota Center18,314
| 3–2
|- align="center" bgcolor="#ffcccc"
| 6
| May 3
| @ Utah
| L 82–94
| Tracy McGrady (26)
| Tracy McGrady (10)
| Shane Battier (4)
| EnergySolutions Arena19,911
| 3–3
|- align="center" bgcolor="#ffcccc"
| 7
| May 5
| Utah
| L 99–103
| McGrady, Yao (29)
| Juwan Howard (7)
| Tracy McGrady (13)
| Toyota Center18,307
| 3–4
|-

Player statistics

Regular season

|-
| 
| style=";"| 82 || style=";"| 82 || style=";"| 37.1 || .375 || .363 || .734 || 3.4 || 5.4 || style=";"| 1.6 || .1 || 13.3
|-
| 
| style=";"| 82 || style=";"| 82 || 36.4 || .446 || .421 || .779 || 4.1 || 2.1 || 1.0 || .7 || 10.1
|-
| 
| 78 || 43 || 22.0 || style=";"| .573 || . || .618 ||  6.7 || .6 || .9 || .2 || 5.6
|-
| 
| 80 || 10 || 27.6 || .437 || style=";"| .441 || .790 || 3.2 || 2.4 || 1.0 || .1 || 10.9
|-
| 
| 80 || 38 || 26.5 || .465 || . || .824 || 5.9 || 1.6 || .4 || .1 || 9.7
|-
| 
| 47 || 0 || 8.1 || .397 || .254 || .789 || .8 || .7 || .4 || .0 || 3.3
|-
| 
| 71 || 71 || 35.8 || .431 || .331 || .707 || 5.3 || style=";"| 6.5 || 1.3 || .5 || 24.6
|-
| 
| 48 || 48 || 33.8 || .516 || .000 || .862 || style=";"| 9.4 || 2.0 || .4 || style=";"| 2.0 || style=";"| 25.0
|-
| 
| 75 || 33 || 17.2 || .556 || . || .690 || 6.5 || .2 || .3 || 1.0 || 3.1
|-
| 
| 35 || 1 || 5.5 || .360 || .333 || style=";"| 1.000 || .7 || .2 || .1 || .0 || 1.5
|-
| 
| 24 || 0 || 8.3 || .306 || .276 || .545 || 1.9 || .3 || .2 || .1 || 1.8
|-
| 
| 39 || 1 || 14.4 || .452 || .250 || .653 || 2.1 || 1.0 || .3 || .3 || 4.9
|-
| 
| 31 || 0 || 8.8 || .319 || .172 || .810 || .7 || .9 || .2 || .0 || 2.7
|-
| 
| 13 || 0 || 10.2 || .409 || . || .800 || 3.1 || .2 || .1 || .1 || 2.3
|-
| 
| 28 || 1 || 21.1 || .411 || .143 || .561 || 4.3 || 1.1 || .9 || .5 || 7.8
|}

Playoffs 

|-
| 
| style=";"| 7 || style=";"| 7 || style=";"| 44.1 || .338 || .320 || .769 || 6.9 || 5.0 || style=";"| 1.9 || .4 || 10.9
|-
| 
| style=";"| 7 || style=";"| 7 || 38.9 || .451 || style=";"| .442 || .875 || 2.6 || 2.1 || 1.7 || 1.0 || 10.3
|-
| 
| style=";"| 7 || style=";"| 7 || 28.1 || .706 || .000 || .400 ||  6.4 || .4 || 1.3 || .4 || 3.7
|-
| 
| style=";"| 7 || 0 || 20.1 || .306 || .261 || .500 || 2.7 || 1.1 || .4 || .3 || 4.6
|-
| 
| style=";"| 7 || 0 || 22.4 || .400 || . || .636 || 4.4 || 1.0 || .7 || .0 || 5.0
|-
| 
| 2 || 0 || 4.0 || .000 || .000 || . || .0 || .0 || .5 || .0 || .0
|-
| 
| style=";"| 7 || style=";"| 7 || 40.0 || .394 || .250 || .737 || 5.9 || style=";"| 7.3 || .7 || .9 || style=";"| 25.3
|-
| 
| style=";"| 7 || style=";"| 7 || 37.1 || .440 || . || .880 || style=";"| 10.3 || .9 || .1 || .7 || 25.1
|-
| 
| style=";"| 7 || 0 || 5.7 || style=";"| 1.000 || . || style=";"| 1.000 || 1.6 || .1 || .0 || .4 || 1.3
|-
| 
| 3 || 0 || 3.0 || .333 || .000 || . || .3 || .0 || .0 || .0 || .7
|-
| 
| 1 || 0 || 3.0 || .500 || . || style=";"| 1.000 || 1.0 || 1.0 || .0 || .0 || 4.0
|-
| 
| 1 || 0 || 3.0 || . || . || style=";"| 1.000 || 4.0 || .0 || .0 || .0 || 2.0
|}

Awards
Yao Ming, All-NBA Second Team
Tracy McGrady, All-NBA Second Team

References

External links
 Official Rockets website

Houston Rockets seasons